The Japan women's national field hockey team represents Japan in the international field hockey competitions.

Tournament history

Summer Olympics
2004 – 8th place
2008 – 10th place
2012 – 9th place
2016 – 10th place
2020 – 11th place

World Cup
1978 – 6th place
1981 – 7th place
1990 – 11th place
2002 – 10th place
2006 – 5th place
2010 – 11th place
2014 – 10th place
2018 – 13th place
2022 – 11th place

Asian Games
1982 – 4th place
1986 – 
1990 – 
1994 – 
1998 – 4th place
2002 – 
2006 – 
2010 – 
2014 – 4th place
2018 – 
2022 – Qualified

Asia Cup
1985 – 
1989 – 
1993 – 4th place
1999 – 4th place
2004 – 
2007 – 
2009 – 4th place
2013 – 
2017 – 4th place
2022 –

Asian Champions Trophy
2010 – 
2011 – 
2013 – 
2016 – 
2018 – 5th place
2021 –

World League
2012–13 – 9th place
2014–15 – 12th place
2016–17 – 11th place

Hockey Nations Cup
 2022 –

Champions Trophy
2007 – 5th place
2008 – 6th place
2012 – 5th place
2014 – 8th place
2018 – 6th place

Champions Challenge
2003 – 
2005 – 
2009 – 
2011 –

Current squad
Squad for the 2022 Women's FIH Hockey World Cup.

Head coach:  Jude Menezes

See also
Japan men's national field hockey team

References

External links

FIH probile

Asian women's national field hockey teams
Field hockey
National team